Zornia glochidiata is a leguminous herb of the Fabaceae family, it is widely distributed in the Sahel regions of West Africa. It is reputed to be an important forage plant in the region.

Morphology
Compound and broad leaves, two foliate; leaflets, ovate - lanceolate, acute at apex and up to 45 x 15 mm, glabrescent or pubescent beneath. The stipules are lanceolate in shape and up to 15 mm in length.

Distribution
Zornia glochidiata is native to many countries in East, West and Southern Africa. It is known locally as dengeere or dengo among the Peul.

Uses
This plant is an important fodder for horses and other animals in the arid and semi arid grasslands of the Sahel but can cause bloating in cattle.

References

Flora of West Tropical Africa
glochidiata